Nile Southern (born December 29, 1960), is an American filmmaker and writer. He is noted for his book The Candy Men, a "biography of a book," about the writing and publishing of the comic sex novel Candy, by Terry Southern and Mason Hoffenberg. He is the son of writer Terry Southern and literary editor Carol Southern.

Footnotes

1960 births
Living people
American filmmakers
Place of birth missing (living people)